Promyshlenny is an abandoned urban locality (an urban-type settlement) under the administrative jurisdiction of the town of republic significance of Vorkuta in the Komi Republic, Russia. It had no recorded population as of the 2010 Census.

History
Promyshlenny was established in 1956 as a mining community in relation to the "Tsentralnoy" and "Promyshlennoy" coal mines. The housing was built by convicts who worked at the mines. A major underground explosion in 1998 killed 23 miners and closed the mines. This led to a rapid economic decline and as a consequence the authorities decided to resettle the population elsewhere. The population prior to the explosion was a little over 1,000 people.

Administrative and municipal status
Within the framework of administrative divisions, the urban-type settlement of Promyshlenny is subordinated to Vorgashor Urban-Type Settlement Administrative Territory, which is itself subordinated to the town of republic significance of Vorkuta. Within the framework of municipal divisions, Promyshlenny is a part of Vorkuta Urban Okrug.

References

Notes

Sources



Urban-type settlements in the Komi Republic
Defunct towns in Russia